T-box 6 is a protein that in humans is encoded by the TBX6 gene.

Function 

This gene is a member of a phylogenetically conserved family of genes that share a common DNA-binding domain, the T-box. T-box genes encode transcription factors involved in the regulation of developmental processes. Knockout studies in mice indicate that this gene is important for specification of paraxial mesoderm structures.

Tbx6 is also required for the segmentation of the paraxial mesoderm into somites, and for the normal development of the dermomyotome in zebrafish. In the absence of Tbx6, the central dermomyotome of zebrafish fails to develop.

Tbx6 functions in a gene regulatory network with mesp-b and ripply1.

References

Further reading